Marlon Reid (born 17 April 1982) is a British professional boxer who was born in Swindon and currently lives in Bath. After reaching the ABA final against George Groves as an amateur Reid boxed for England and made his debut as a professional boxer on 17 October 2008 against Gary Cooper and won on points. 
Reid continued his great start winning his first four fights,two by way of knock out.

Amateur career 

Reid boxed for the Walcot ABA club in Swindon.  As an amateur Reid made it to the ABA finals at his first attempt as a senior. He faced George Groves at York Hall, Bethnal Green on 2 December 2006, Reid lost 24-18 on points. George Groves was favourite and has since gone on to become the Commonwealth super middleweight champion.

Reid also represented England including the Four Nations in Calais, France in April 2007 where he reached the semi-final against Jean Mickael Raymond of France losing 24-19 on points.

Professional career 

Reid fought his first professional fight on 17 October 2008 and had a great start to his career winning his first four fights against Gary Cooper, James Tucker, Sherman Alleyne and Ernie Smith.

Reid suffered his first defeat on 24 October 2009 on points against Patrick Mendy at the Riviera International Conference Centre, Torquay, Devon. Though Reid was suffering from a viral infection at the time.

Reid came back on 4 December 2009 with a win over Pawel Trebinski on points but then suffered defeat in his next fight against Steffan Hughes.

Personal life 

Reid attended Churchfields School in Swindon.

He lives in Bristol, England.

Professional boxing record 

|align=center colspan=8 |5 Wins (2 knockouts, 3 decisions) 2 Loss, 0 Draws
|-
!align=center style="border-style: none none solid solid; background: #e3e3e3"|Res.
!align=center style="border-style: none none solid solid; background: #e3e3e3"|Opponent
!align=center style="border-style: none none solid solid; background: #e3e3e3"|Type
!align=center style="border-style: none none solid solid; background: #e3e3e3"|Rounds fought 
!align=center style="border-style: none none solid solid; background: #e3e3e3"|Date
!align=center style="border-style: none none solid solid; background: #e3e3e3"|Venue
!align=center style="border-style: none none solid solid; background: #e3e3e3"|Location
!align=center style="border-style: none none solid solid; background: #e3e3e3"|Notes
|-
| Loss
| Steffan Hughes
|TKO
|4 
|23 April 2010
|Oasis Leisure Centre
|Swindon, Wiltshire, England
|
|-
| Win
| Pawel Trebinski
|PTS
|6 
|4 December 2010
|Oasis Leisure Centre
|Swindon, Wiltshire, England
|
|-
| Loss
| Patrick Mendy
|PTS
|6 
|24 October 2009
|Riviera International Conference Centre
|Torquay, Devon, England
|
|-
| Win
| Ernie Smith
|TKO
|1 
|24 July 2009
|Oasis Leisure Centre
|Swindon, Wiltshire, England
|
|-
| Win
| Sherman Alleyne
|TKO
|4 
|13 February 2009
|Oasis Leisure Centre
|Swindon, Wiltshire, England
|
|-
| Win
| James Tucker
|PTS
|4 
|14 December 2008
|Thistle Hotel
|Bristol, England
|
|-
| Win
| Gary Cooper
|PTS
|4 
|17 October 2008
|Oasis Leisure Centre
|Swindon, Wiltshire, England
|

References

External links 
 

Living people
1982 births
English male boxers
Middleweight boxers